Daim or DAIM may refer to:


People 
 Azimi Daim (born 1964), Malaysian politician 
 DAIM (born 1971 as Mirko Reisser), German graffiti artist
 Daim Zainuddin (born 1938), former Finance Minister of Malaysia
 Olivier le Daim (born Olivier de Neckere; ca. 1428–1484), close advisor of Louis XI of France
 Wilfried Daim (1923–2016), Austrian psychologist, psychotherapist, writer and art collector

Places 
 Daim, Iran or Deym (Persian: ديم), a village in Iran
 Daim, a village in the municipality of Arnreit, Upper Austria

Other uses 
 Daim bar, a Swedish chocolate bar

See also 
 Daimler (disambiguation)